In differential geometry, the twist of a ribbon is its rate of axial rotation. According to Love (1944) twist is defined by

The total twist number  can be decomposed (Moffatt & Ricca 1992) into normalized total torsion  and intrinsic twist  as

where  is the torsion of the space curve , and  denotes the total rotation angle of  along .  Neither  nor  are independent of the ribbon field .  Instead, only the normalized torsion  is an invariant of the curve  (Banchoff & White 1975).

When the ribbon is deformed so as to pass through an inflectional state (i.e.   has a point of inflection), the torsion  becomes singular. This behavior has many important consequences for energy considerations in many fields of science (Ricca 1997, 2005; Goriely 2006).

See also
Twist (screw theory)
Twist (rational trigonometry)
Twisted sheaf

References

Banchoff, T.F. & White, J.H. (1975) The behavior of the total twist and self-linking number of a closed space curve under inversions. Math. Scand. 36, 254–262.
Goriely, A. (2006) Twisted elastic rings and the rediscoveries of Michell’s instability. J Elasticity 84, 281-299.
Love, A.E.H. (1944) A Treatise on the Mathematical Theory of Elasticity. Dover, 4th Ed., New York.
Moffatt, H.K. & Ricca, R.L. (1992) Helicity and the Calugareanu invariant. Proc. R. Soc. London A 439, 411-429. Also in: (1995) Knots and Applications (ed. L.H. Kauffman), pp. 251-269. World Scientific.
Ricca, R.L. (1997) Evolution and inflexional instability of twisted magnetic flux tubes. Solar Physics 172, 241-248.
Ricca, R.L. (2005) Inflexional disequilibrium of magnetic flux tubes. Fluid Dynamics Research 36, 319-332.

Differential geometry
Topology